The 1995 Giro d'Italia was the 78th edition of the Giro d'Italia, one of cycling's Grand Tours. The Giro began in Perugia on 13 May, and Stage 12 occurred on 25 May with a stage from Borgo a Mozzano. The race finished in Milan on 4 June.

Stage 12
25 May 1995 — Borgo a Mozzano to Cento,

Stage 13
26 May 1995 — Pieve di Cento to Rovereto,

Stage 14
27 May 1995 — Trento to Schnals,

Stage 15
28 May 1995 — Schnals to Lenzerheide,

Stage 16
29 May 1995 — Lenzerheide to Treviglio,

Stage 17
30 May 1995 — Cenate Sotto to Selvino,  (ITT)

Stage 18
31 May 1995 — Stradella to Sanctuary of Vicoforte,

Stage 19
1 June 1995 — Mondovì to Pontechianale,

Stage 20
2 June 1995 — Briançon to Gressoney-Saint-Jean,

Stage 21
3 June 1995 — Pont-Saint-Martin to Luino,

Stage 22
4 June 1995 — Luino to Milan,

References

1995 Giro d'Italia
Giro d'Italia stages